The golden-crowned snake (Cacophis squamulosus) is a small species of venomous snake in the family Elapidae. The species is endemic to Australia.

Habitat
Like other Cacophis species, the golden-crowned snake is a forest specialist, particularly rainforest. It prefers deeper forested areas, particularly rainforest on mountain slopes, however it can show up in suburbs near waterways and moist environments with ground cover and shelter.

Venom
Cacophis squamulosus is only mildly venomous; however, it will bluff and mock bite if threatened, rearing into an S-shape to display the bright orange ventral pigmentation. Bites from larger individuals may present a health risk; however, it is more likely to attempt to intimidate those it feels threatened by.

Diet
The diet of the golden-crowned snake consists mostly of skinks and other small lizards which they hunt at night; they may also take frogs and tadpoles.

Geographic range
Cacophis squamulosus is localised to eastern Australia, from Canberra, ACT, to Cairns, QLD.

Description
The golden-crowned snake has a dorsal surface grayish-brown to dark brown in colour, and a ventral surface of orange to pink, with a mid-line of black spots. The "crown" is a pale yellow-brown stripe starting at the snout and sweeping back along both sides of the head, not connecting at the back of the head as in C. krefftii or C. harriettae, instead trailing down the neck. The Dorsal scales are in 15 rows at mid-body.

Reproduction
Cacophis squamulosus is oviparous.

References

Further reading
Cogger HG (2014). Reptiles and Amphibians of Australia, Seventh Edition. Clayton, Victoria, Australia: CSIRO Publishing. xxx + 1,033 pp. .
Duméril A-M-C, Bibron G, Duméril A [-H-A] (1854). Erpétologie générale ou histoire naturelle complète des reptiles. Tome septième. Deuxième partie. Comprenant l'histoire des serpents venimeux. [= General Herpetology or the Complete Natural History of Reptiles. Volume 7. Part 2. Containing the Natural History of the Venomous Snakes]. Paris: Roret. xii + pp. 781-1536. (Pseudelaps squamulosus, new species, pp. 1235-1236). (in French).

Cacophis
Reptiles described in 1854
Taxa named by André Marie Constant Duméril
Taxa named by Gabriel Bibron
Taxa named by Auguste Duméril